The 2000–01 Copa del Rey was the 99th staging of the Copa del Rey.

The competition started on 30 August 2000 and concluded on 30 March 2001 with the Final, held at the Estadio La Cartuja in Sevilla.

Format 

 All rounds are played over two legs apart the final which is played a single match in a neutral venue and the Rounds of 32 and 64, which are played a single match playoff in the field of lower-level opponent. In these rounds teams from 1ª División start as top seeds and can not face each other.
 In the event that aggregate scores finish level, the away goals rule. (This rule applies also in extra time)
 In case of a tie on aggregate, will play an extra time of 30 minutes, and if no goals are scored during extra time, the tie is decided by penalty shootout.
 The winners of the competition will earn a place in the group stage of next season's UEFA Cup, if they have not already qualified for European competition, if so then the runners-up will instead take this berth.

Preliminary round

Round of 64

Round of 32

Round of 16 

|}

First leg

Second leg

Quarter-finals 

|}

First leg

Second leg

Semi-finals 

|}

First leg

Second leg

Final

Top goalscorers

References

External links 

  RSSSF
  Linguasport
  Youtube: Granada CF career cup 2000-01

Copa del Rey seasons
1